Hong Ling may refer to:

Hong Ling (actress) (born 1994), Singaporean actress
 Hong Ling (geneticist) (1966–2020), Chinese geneticist and professor